Tiffany Pezzulo (born March 13, 1975) is an American former racing cyclist. After retiring, Pezzulo now works in logistics for UCI Women's Continental Team .

Major results

2010
 8th International Tour de Toona
2011
 4th Overall Tulsa Tough
2013
 8th Overall Tulsa Tough
2015
 9th Overall Tulsa Tough

See also
 List of 2016 UCI Women's Teams and riders

References

External links
 

1975 births
Living people
American female cyclists
Place of birth missing (living people)
21st-century American women